Bucket of Tongues is a collection of twenty-three short stories by the Scottish writer Duncan McLean. Published in 1992, it was McLean's first book.

Cover
The front cover includes a quote by Janice Galloway:

Stories
 1.  "When God comes and gathers his jewels"  - Unemployed couple; aftermath of a burglary.
 2.  "Cold kebab breakfast"  - Drunken Christmas Eve celebrations and food.
 3.  "A/deen soccer thugs kill all visiting fans"  - At the fish bar before the game.
 4.  "The big man that dropped dead"  - Tale of a poet.
 5.  "The doubles"  - Peter's bedroom crisis.
 6.  "After Guthrie's"  - Ruminations about the pub, the Square, the town, a relationship, life.
 7.  "New Year"  - David alone on New Year's Eve; noises outside.
 8.  "Headnip"  - Worklife in the kitchen at Guddler's restaurant.
 9.  "Doubled up with pain" - An encounter.
 10.  "Bod is dead"  - Buzby, a skateboarder, is furious.
 11.  "Bed of thistles"  - Wedding reception shenanigans.
 12.  "Quality control" 
 13.  "Hours of darkness" 
 14.  "Three nasty stories" 
 15.  "Thistle story" 
 16.  "Lurch" 
 17.  "Dying and being alive" 
 18.  "Loaves and fishes, nah" 
 19.  "The druids shite it, fail to show" 
 20.  "Shoebox" 
 21.  "Jesus fuckeroo" 
 22.  "Tongue" 
 23.  "Lucky to be alive" 

1992 short story collections
British short story collections
Secker & Warburg books
1992 debut works